The following is a timeline of the Gwangmu Reform, which was a reforms for modernize Korea from the late 19th century to the early 20th century. Although many people have the notion that this period was marked with the fight for power between Heungseon Daewongun (흥선대원군, 興宣大院君 - King Gojong's father) and Queen Min (King Gojong's wife), it was rather the era of great changes relevant to modernisation after the harsh oppressive years during the "Regency" of King Gojong's father. This reform also was one of the most successful for modernising in a short period of time during Korean history. Although the reform was mostly centred on the time period after the proclamation of the Korean Empire, it includes a number of other previous events that are closely related to the reform.

Early modernizations (1883–94)
Phase one of the Gwangmu Reform began with the first Korean delegation to America, and opening up for modernisation. Because of recurring Chinese interventions led by Li Hongzhang (이홍장,李鴻章), there was relatively less development of Chosun compared to Phase Three. The main innovator in this phase is Queen Min.

1883: March. The Korea-Japanese Underground Cable Construction Treaty (조일해저전선부설조약,朝日海底電線敷設條約) was signed by Korea and Japan. This led to a telegraphic connection between Busan (부산,釜山) and Nagasaki (長崎).
1883: May. American minister Lucius Foote arrived to take command of the modernization of Chosun's older army units that had not started Westernizing. 

1883: July. The first delegate to America was sent by the Chosun government. The Ministry of Presswork and Publication (박문국,博文局)was opened for the modernisation of the printing industry.
1883: August. The first edition of the Hanseong sunbo (한성순보,漢城旬報) was published on this year. This is the first newspaper to be published in Chosun. 
1884: The Daedong Corporation (대동상회,大同商會), the first modern domestic corporation in Korea, was established.
1885: February. The first Royal Medical Clinic, the Gwanghyewon (광혜연,廣惠院) was opened with the introduction of modern medicine by Horace Newton Allen. The name changed to Jaejoongwon (제중원,濟衆院) a month later.
1885: May. Presbyterianism is introduced to Chosun by Horace Grant Underwood. Many other Christian pastors came to Chosun, which became the fundamental background for religious freedom and equality between Koreans.
1885: July. The Korea-Chinese Cable Treaty (조청전선조약,朝淸電線條約) is signed and enforced, leading to a telegraphic connection between Hanseong and Peking.
1885: August. Establishment of the Baejae Hakdang (배재학당,培材學堂) by Henry Appenzeller. Although initially recognised as an 'Academy', it became a college in 1895.
1886: February. Proclamation of abolishment of slavery inheritance within Chosun. This is the unofficial start of equalisation of people within the kingdom. It also paved the way for abolishment of slavery in the Gabo Reform. 
1886: May. Queen Min gave her patronage to the first all-girls' educational institution, Ewha Academy (이화학당,梨花學堂) , established in Seoul by American missionary, Mary F. Scranton. This institution later became the Ewha University (이화여자대학교,梨花女子大學校). 

1886: September. There also was the establishment of the Yukyeong-gongwon (육영공원,育英公院). This was the first public school to be opened in Chosun. 
1887: March. The Korean Imperial Telegraphic Office (조선전보총국,朝鮮電報總局) was opened for a more efficient management of the telegraphic lines operating in Korea. The office was in use until 1893, when it became into the Korean Imperial Telegraphic and Postal Office (전우총국,電郵總局).
1887: October. American missionary Scranton establishes the first women's hospital, the Lillian Harris Memorial Hospital (보구여관,普救女館). The hospital also operated the first medical class for women. One of the students went to the Woman's Medical College of Baltimore, becoming the first female doctor at Korea in 1900.
1888: February. 1888, General William McEntyre Dye and two other military instructors arrived from the US, followed in May by a fourth instructor. The Americans taught at the first modern military academy called the Yeonmu-gongwon (연무공원,鍊武公院) and trained many Koreans.
1888: May. Korea independently constructs the Southern Cable Line (남로전선,南路電線), connecting Hanseong and Busan.
1890: January. The Korean Merchant's Association for Fairness is opened by Kim Jae-jun(김재전,金在田), Lee Gun-seo (이군서,李君瑞) and Park Myung-gyu(박명규朴明珪). The Association promoted usage of foreign weight and measurement standards in the domestic market. It had offices in Incheon, Wonsan and Busan. 
1891: February. The Korean Northern Cable Treaty (조선북로전선조약,朝鮮北路電線條約) is signed by China and Korea. By this treaty, the telegraphic service from Seoul to Wonsan is in operation.
1892: Issuance of the Baekdonghwa (백동화,白銅貨), with the enforcement of the New Currency Regulations (신식화폐조례,新式貨幣條例). Although it caused some chaos on which currency to use, it also stabilised the inflation within the peninsula.
1893: March. The Korean Imperial Naval Academy (통제영학당,統制營學堂) is established. The academy produces approximately 160 officers before its close during and after the First Sino-Japanese War.
1894: February. The outbreak of the Donghak Peasant Revolution (동학농민운동,東學農民運動). The communication between the Donghak faction and King Gojong were smooth until Japanese intervention- which led to the First Sino-Japanese War.

Japanese interventions (1894–97)

This phase show much development within the Korean Peninsula. It is a brief period of an intense power struggle between Japan and Russia, competing to expand their influence in the peninsula.

1894:  June. The Gabo Reform (갑오개혁,甲午改革) is initiated by Prime Minister Kim Hong-jip (김홍집,金弘集), Park Jung-yang (박정양,朴定陽),Kim Yun-sik (김윤식,金允植), Cho Hei-yeon (조희연,趙羲淵), Kim Ga-jin (김가진,金嘉鎭), An Gyung-su (안경수,安駉壽), Kim Hak-wu (김학우,金鶴羽) and Yu Gil-jun (유길준,兪吉濬). The heteronomous reform ends in February the next year. It was an attempt of Japan by using Japanophile Korean officials to change Korea into a system more like Japan, for an easier administration of Korea after its annexation.

1895:  8 October. Empress Myeongseong (명성황후,明成皇后) is assassinated by Japanese agents under Miura Goro(三浦梧樓). Japan gets much criticism from other modern countries about such barbaric methods, and therefore arrests Miura as a matter of formality. After spending some time in Hiroshima prison, however, he is released due to the "lack of evidence".
1896:  11 February. King Gojong fled to the Russian legation in Seoul (아관파천,俄館播遷).
1896:  2 July. Establishment of the Independence Club by Seo Jae-pil (서재필,徐載弼). Seo took part in the Gapsin Coup (갑신정변,甲申政變) in 1884. Some people related to the coup d’État were Kim Ok-gyun (김옥균,金玉均) and Park Yung-hyo (박영효,朴泳孝).

Later modernizations  (1897–1905)
Phase two of the Gwangmu Reform began with the proclamation of the Korean Empire on 4 October 1897. Efforts for modernisation were spurred with the coronation of Gojong as Emperor but were restrained by Japan after the Russo-Japanese War in 1905. The main innovator in this phase is Emperor Gojong.

1897:  February. King Gojong established the Board of Marshals (원수부,元帥府). All military power was henceforth centralized to the Emperor.
1897:  20 February. King Gojong (고종,高宗) returned to the palace after 1 year of refuge at the Russian legation.
1897:  September. The Donghwa Pharmacy opened in Seoul, Korea. The established corporation, now known as the Dong Wha Pharmacy Corporation., Limited (동화약품(주),同和藥品(株)). The company, now the oldest pharmacy-based corporation in Korea, has products that are nationally famous, with its 'folding fan' trademark.
1897:  October. Gojong declares the Korean Empire (대한제국,大韓帝國) and became the Gwangmu Emperor, the first imperial head of state and hereditary sovereign of the Empire of Korea. Most historians view this as the official declaration of the Gwangmu Reform (광무개혁,光武改革). Soongsil Academy was founded in Pyongyang as a private school by Dr. William M. Baird, a missionary of the Northern Presbyterian Church of America. The Soongsil University is its descendant.
1897:  November. John McLeavy Brown constructed his lasting legacy upon the Korean Empire- the Pagoda Park. It is notable the March 1st Movement, an important part in the Korean independence movement was initiated in this park.
1898:  January. The Seoul Electric Corporation (한성전기회사,漢城電氣會社), or the Korea-American Electric Corporation (한미전기회사,韓美電氣會社) was opened as a joint-venture company between Americans Henry Collbran, H.R. Bostwick and Emperor Gojong. A public corporation it was responsible for the construction of the streetlamps in Seoul, along with imports of numerous other electricity-related devices. The Korea Electric Power Corporation (한국전력공사,韓國電力公社) is its descendant.
1898:  May. The Jong-hyun Catholic Church (종현본당,鐘峴本堂) was finished of construction. It was the first Gothic architecture to be built in Korea. It was later called the Myeongdong Cathedral (명동성당,明洞聖堂), the centre of the Korean 20th century. It is registered as a national historical landmark.
1898:  August. Brown reported blueprint of the Pan-Korean railway to Gojong.
1898:  September. Kim Hong-nyuk (김홍륙,金鴻陸) attempted assassination of Gojong by putting excess amount of opium in his coffee. It is to be noted that Gojong was a coffee lover. While Gojong spat out the coffee upon drinking it, his son Sunjong (순종,純宗) drank the opium-tainted coffee and suffered from mental and physical disabilities from the incident.
1898:  September 5. The Imperial Capital Gazette released its first print. The president of the company was Nam Gung-euk (남궁억,南宮檍).

1899:  January. Several Korean entrepreneurs and high-ranking officials, such as Sim Sang-hun (심상훈,沈相薰), Minister of Agriculture Min Byung-suk (민병석,閔丙奭), Field Marshal Min Yung-gi (민영기,閔泳綺), Vice-minister of Justice Yi Geun-ho (이근호,李根澔), Head of the Treasury (전환국장,典圜局長) Yi Yong-ik (이용익,李容翊), Minister of National Defense (원수부군무국장,元帥府軍務局長) Jo dong-yun (조동윤,趙東潤), Song Mun-sup (송문섭,宋文燮), Jung yung-du (정영두,鄭永斗) and Kim gi-young (김기영,金基永) established the Daehan Chunil Bank (대한천일은행,大韓天一銀行). The bank operated as both a local bank and central bank. The bank is the predecessor of the Woori Bank.
1899:  April. The Gwangjaewon (광제원,廣濟院), the first modern national hospital, opened. It is the present-day Seoul National University Hospital, which is one of the biggest hospital in South Korea and a forerunner in many fields of medical sciences.
1899:  May. American businessmen Henry Collbran and H.R.Bostwick opened the first tram lines within Seoul (the West gate-East gate line).
1899:  August. The promulgation of the Korean Imperial Legislation (대한제국국제,大韓帝國國制) by the Ministry of Justice (법규교정소,法規校正所). This is of certain significance, as it led to Gojong's success in modernisation of the empire. It also took international laws into consideration. Although the actual legislation is very short, numerous other edicts were proclaimed to be used like laws.
1899:  September. The establishment of the Northwest Railway Bureau (서북철도국,西北鐵道局), an agency within the Gungnaebu (궁내부,宮內府). Its mission was to construct a railway from Seoul to Sinuiju (신의주,新義州) without the help from foreign countries. This department later became the Korail, or the Korea Railroad Corporation (한국철도공사,韓國鐵道公社). 
On 2 December 1899, first urban rail transit was built in Hansung, which connected Jongno District to Namdaemun. In January 1900, it was lengthen to Yongsan District. 
1900:  January. Korean Empire became a member of the Universal Postal Union. 
1900: January. First mail of Korea was sent. 
1900:  April. Construction of streetlamps on Jong-ro, Seoul. The Korean Empire opens its own exhibition pavilion in the Exposition Universelle of Paris.

1900:  July. Seoul-Incheon railroad opened with completion of the Han River Bridge (한강철교,漢江鐵橋). The bridge later becomes part of the Hangang Railway Bridge. It is still in operation.
1900:  October. The Hanseung Secondary School (한성중학교,漢城中學校) was finished construction. It is the predecessor of Kyunggi High School (경기고등학교,京畿高等學校), one of the best high schools in Korea.
1901:  February. Proclamation of ordinances for the new currency (adoption of the Gold Standard). Franz Eckert arrived to Seoul for establishment of the Korean Imperial Marching Band. He composed the Korean Imperial National Anthem. It is to be noted he also composed the Kimigayo, the Japanese counterpart.
1901:  March. The Belgium–Korea Treaty of 1901 (조백수호통상조약,朝白修好通商條約) is signed by Jae-sun Park (박제순,朴齊純), delegate of the Korean Empire and Leon Vincart, the Belgian counterpart. It is notable the treaty was not terminated, unlike many others after the Korea-Japanese 1905 Treaty.
1901:  October. Inauguration of the Jigye Ahmun (지계아문,地契衙門), a system to issue legal documents of property ownership (지계,地契). It marks the start of a modern cadastral survey project.

1902:  March. Embarkment of construction upon the Seoul-Gaesung line, Dispatch of government officials with jurisdiction over Gando (간도,間島)
1902: May, first graduation of Medical School of Korean Empire. One of the first 
1902:  December. First immigration of 100 Koreans to Hawaii. After the 102 immigrants who arrived into Honolulu Harbor, the number of Koreans in Hawaii exploded to 7,000 within 2 years.
1903:  January. The Korean Empire became member of the International Committee of the Red Cross.
1903:  February. Establishment of the Hanseung Bank (한성은행,漢城銀行). It is the present-day Shinhan Bank (신한은행,新韓銀行), one of the most prominent banks in Korea.
1903:  April. The Mitsui Corporation (三井グループ) sold a battleship to the Korean Empire for 250,000 Won. The ship, which was a reconstructed cargo ship for military usage, was a slapdash product by the Japanese and was extremely inefficient. The battleship was christened "KIS Yangmu" (양무호,楊武號), which means 'Growing the strength of a Nation'.
1903:  December. Collbran and Bostwick started construction of the Ttuk Island freshwater reservoir. The reservoir is still being used as the Ttuk Island Drainage basin 1 reservoir (뚝도수원지제1정수장,--水源地第一淨水場).
1904:  March. The first meteorological observatories were constructed in Mokpo and various other places. 
1904:  July. The establishment of the Korean Daily News (대한매일신보,大韓每日申報). It is now the Seoul Shinmun, the oldest newspaper still operating in Korea.
1904:  September. Jejungwon hospital in Seoul, was renamed Severance Hospital, added Severance Hospital Medical School and the attached School of Nursing. 

1904:  November. The Pre-dreadnought battleship KIS Guangjae (광제호,光濟號) started operation in Incheon, Korea. It had a displacement of 1,056 tonnes. Its full speed was 14.77 knots with 2483 horsepower. The engine was a triple-expansion steam engine. The battleship and was made by Kawasaki Shipbuilding Corporation (川崎造船) and was given the mission for patrolling the Western Korean maritime territory. It is also the first Korean battleship to be equipped with the wireless telegraph.
1905:  June. the Taft–Katsura Agreement- America recognized Korea as Japanese territory and Japanese recognized Philippines as American territory.

1905:  May. Yi Yong-ik (이용익,李容翊), Secretary of the Imperial Treasury, established Bosung College (보성학교,普成學校), later to be known as the Korea University (고려대학교,高麗大學校).
1905:  June. 30 merchants establish the Hanseung Chamber of Commerce (한성상무회의소,漢城商務會議所), the first of its kind in Korea. The first president of the association was Kim gi-yeung (김기영,金基永). They also operated the Commerce Monthly (상공월보,商工月報), which was the first business journal.
1905:  November. Japan declared Korea a protectorate after success at the Russo-Japanese War. Japan forced Korea to sign the Eulsa Treaty (을사조약,乙巳條約), for formalisation of its sphere of influence around the Korean Peninsula.

Japanese interventions and annexation of Korea (1905–10)
This was the darkest period of the Gwangmu Reform, ending with the annexation of Korea by Japan on the 29th of August, 1910.

1906:  January. Yi Yong-ik, former Secretary of the Imperial Treasury, is assassinated in Vladivostok, Russia.
1907:  June. The Hague Secret Emissary Affair (헤이그 특사 사건,海牙特使事件) was initiated by Emperor Gojong and carried by Sang-sul Yi (이상설,李相卨), Jun Yi(이준,李儁), Wi-jong Yi (이위종,李瑋鍾) and Homer Hulbert. Gojong initiated this by a confidential invitation from the former Russian Tsar, Nicholas II. While Hulbert lured the Japanese spies into the wrong path, the three Koreans went to the Hague conference. However, they were blocked by the Japanese for the reasons that they were not nation-states even though they were on the list of invitation. Undaunted, they sought for interest of the press and found hope. Two notable figures they gained attention of are Bertha von Suttner and William Thomas Stead.

1907:  July 18. Gojong was forced to abdicate in favour of his son, Sunjong.
1907:  July 24. The Japan–Korea Treaty of 1907 (한일신협약,韓日新協約) is enforced by Japan. It states that the Korean Empire would act under guidance of the Japanese Resident-General, and have also lost its diplomatic rights as a protectorate. 
1908:  March. Durham Stevens, a former employee of Japan's Ministry of Foreign Affairs, is assassinated by Jang In-hwan (장인환,張仁煥) and Jeon Myeong-un (전명운,田明雲) in San Francisco for his active participation and support upon the Japanese presence coming into the Korean government.
1909:  September. Gando is reclaimed by China after the Sino-Japanese convention over Gando (간도협약,間島協約).
1909:  October. Ito Hirobumi (the first Resident-General) is assassinated by Korean Lieutenant-General An Jung-geun (안중근,安重根). This incident was dramatized in the recent Korean musical, Hero (영웅,英雄). The musical premiered in Lincoln Center for the Performing Arts on August 23, 2011.
1910:  August. The Japan–Korea Treaty of 1910 started the annexation of the Korean Empire by Japan.

References
 Bird, Isabella L. Korea and Her Neighbors a Narrative of Travel, with an Account of the Recent Vicissitudes and Present Position of the Country. New York: Revell, 1898. Print.
 Chung, K. (1910–2004). History of Korean Empire Vol. 9. Seoul, Korea: Somyung. 
 Ito, Y. (2009). Ito Hirobumi - A man who modernized Japan. Tokyo, Japan: Kodansha. .
 Jansen, M. B. (1961). Sakamoto Ryoma and the Meiji Restoration. Stanford, CA: Stanford University Press. 
   OCLC 14719443
 Carnegie Endowment for International Peace, Division of International Law. (1921). Pamphlet 43: Korea, Treaties and Agreements." The Endowment: Washington, D.C. 
 Clare, Israel Smith; Hubert Howe Bancroft and George Edwin Rines. (1910). Library of universal history and popular science. New York: The Bancroft society. 
 Cordier, Henri and Edouard Chavannes. (1905).  "Traité entre le Japon et la Corée," Revue internationale de Sinologie (International Journal of Chinese studies). Leiden: E. J. Brill. 

 Korean Mission to the Conference on the Limitation of Armament, Washington, D.C., 1921-1922. (1922). Korea's Appeal to the Conference on Limitation of Armament. Washington: U.S. Government Printing Office. 
 Pak, Chʻi-yŏng. (2000). Korea and the United Nations. The Hague: Kluwer Law International. ; 
 United States. Dept. of State. (1919). Catalogue of treaties: 1814-1918. Washington: Government Printing Office. 
 Kang, J. (2007). Modern history of Korea Vol.5. Seoul, Korea: Inmulgwa Sasang. 
 Korean Mission to the Conference on the Limitation of Armament, Washington, D.C., 1921-1922. (1922). Korea's Appeal to the Conference on Limitation of Armament. Washington: U.S. Government Printing Office. OCLC 12923609 
 United States. Dept. of State. (1919). Catalogue of treaties: 1814-1918. Washington: Government Printing Office. 
 Kim, G. (1928/1997). Baekbeomilji. Seoul, Korea: Hakminsa. 
 Nam, K. (1999). History of Eastern Asia Seoul, Korea: Greenbee. 
 Ravina, M. (2004). The last samurai: The life and battles of Saigo Takamori. Hoboken, NJ: John Wiley & Sons. 
 Genthe, Siegfried. Genthes Reisen. Berlin: Allg. Verein Für Deutsche Literatur, 1905. Print.
 Rossetti, Carlo. Corea E Coreani: Impressioni E Ricerche Sull'impero Del Gran Han. Bergamo: Istituto Italiano D'Arti Grafiche, 1904. Print.
 An, Joo Yun. "The Korean Empire: a 13-year Plan." History Special. Dir. Jung Hoon Go. KBS. KBS1, Seoul, 22 Sept. 2006. Television.

Liu, Kwang-ching. "The Confucian as Patriot and Pragmatist: Li Hung-Chang's Formative Years, 1823–1866." Harvard Journal of Asiatic Studies 30 (1970): 5–45.
Liang Qichao,"Biography of Li Hongzhang"
 Mutsu, Munemitsu. (1982). Kenkenroku'' (trans. Gordon Mark Berger). Tokyo: University of Tokyo Press. ; 
 Yi, Tʻae-jin, Chae-ho Kim, Hyun-Jong Wang, Gi-bong Kim, Dong-taek Kim, Young hun Yi, Jin-oh Ju, Sang-gyu Kang, Young-hei Seo, Hun-chang Yi, and Byung chun Yi. Kojong Hwangje Yŏksa Chʻŏngmunhoe. Comp. The Kyosu Shinmoon. Sŏul-si: Pʻurŭn Yŏksa, 2005. Print.
 Millard, Thomas F. The New Far East an Examination into the New Position of Japan ... London: Hodder & Stoughton, 1906. Print.
 Yang, Sang Hyun. The Management of Military Budget and Military Reform of the Korean Empire. Thesis. Ulsan University, 2007. Print.

Further reading
 Yi, T'ae-jin. "The Scene of Modernization." Reillumination upon the Gojong Era. Seoul: Taehaksa, 2000. 231–402. Print.

References 

Korean Empire
Reform
Gwangmu Reform